Webster Station in Dayton, Ohio is one of the nine historic districts in the city. Webster Station was empty land until it was bought in 1843. Its approximate boundaries are Keowee Street to the east, Fourth Street to the south, St. Clair Street to the west, and the Great Miami and Mad Rivers to the north. Webster Station is situated north of the Oregon District and just east of Downtown Dayton. It is a popular location for urban style lofts, such as Delco Lofts and the Cannery, and has seen breweries and bars open in recent years. It is also the location of Fifth Third Field, home of the Dayton Dragons minor league baseball team.

References

External links
 Preservation Dayton
 City of Dayton Official Website

Neighborhoods in Dayton, Ohio